Mario Vilella Martínez was the defending champion but chose not to defend his title.

Pedro Cachín won the title after defeating Nicolás Kicker 6–4, 6–4 in the final.

Seeds

Draw

Finals

Top half

Bottom half

References

External links
Main draw
Qualifying draw

Internazionali di Tennis Città di Todi - 1
2022 Singles